Paul Mbong (born 2 September 2001) is a Maltese professional footballer who plays as a forward for Birkirkara and the Malta national team.

Club career
Mbong started his youth career with Hibernians, before joining Birkirkara in 2016. He made his senior team debut on 8 March 2019 in a 2–0 league win against Tarxien Rainbows. He scored his first goal on 16 February 2020 in a 4–1 league win against Valletta.

International career
Mbong made his senior team debut on 3 September 2020 in a 3–2 UEFA Nations League defeat against Faroe Islands.

Personal life
Mbong is of Nigerian descent. His father Essien Mbong was also a footballer and spent most of his career with Hibernians. He is the younger brother of fellow Maltese international Joseph Mbong and Siggiewi F.C forward Emmanuel Mbong.

Career statistics

International

References

External links
 at birkirkarafc.com

2001 births
Living people
Association football forwards
Maltese footballers
Malta youth international footballers
Malta under-21 international footballers
Malta international footballers
Maltese Premier League players
Birkirkara F.C. players
Maltese people of Nigerian descent